The Nation (La Nation in French) is a municipality in Eastern Ontario, located within Canada's National Capital Region, in the United Counties of Prescott and Russell. Formed in 1998, the municipality consists of the former townships of Caledonia, Cambridge and South Plantagenet, as well as the Village of St. Isidore.

The municipality is crossed by the South Nation River after which the municipality was named.

Communities

The township comprises the communities of Benoit, Bradley Creek, Caledonia Springs, Fenaghvale, Forest Park, Fournier, Franklins Corners, Gagnon, Johnsons Ferry, Lalonde, Limoges, Longtinville, Martels Corners, Mayerville, Parkers Corners, Proulx, Riceville, Routhier, Sandown, Skye, St. Albert, St. Amour, St. Bernardin, Ste-Rose-de-Prescott, St. Isidore and Velfranc. The township administrative offices are located north of Casselman on Route 500, with a satellite office in Fournier.

The ghost town of Lemieux, abandoned in the early 1990s, is also located within the municipality.

Demographics 

The Nation also contains one of the larger concentrations of Francophones in Ontario. According to the 2016 Canadian Census, 64.7% of the population have French as their first language, while 31.7% have English as their first language.

Attractions
The Nation Municipality is home to Calypso Water Park near Limoges and the Alfred Bog. The Ontario Ministry of Natural Resources and Forestry has designated the Alfred Bog as "a provincially significant wetland and an Area of Natural and Scientific Interest." Species of interest include the palm warbler, northern pitcher-plant, pink lady's slipper, cottongrass, bog elfin and bog copper butterflies, and ebony boghaunter dragonfly. It also hosts one of the most southerly herds of moose. The bog is open to the public with a  boardwalk for nature walks.

The Prescott and Russell Recreational Trail goes through the township.

The Larose Forest is also partially located in this municipality.

See also
 Transit Eastern Ontario operated under the authority of The North Glengarry Prescott Russell (NGPR) Transport Board
List of townships in Ontario
List of francophone communities in Ontario

References

External links

Lower-tier municipalities in Ontario
Municipalities in the United Counties of Prescott and Russell